The Night of Queen Isabeau is a 1920 German silent historical drama film directed by Robert Wiene and starring Fern Andra, Fritz Kortner, Hans Heinrich von Twardowski and Elsa Wagner. The film depicts the marriage between the mad Charles VI of France and his wife Queen Isabeau. It was shot at the Babelsberg Studios in Berlin. The film is now considered a lost film, but contemporary reviews praised Wiene's direction. The story revolves around insanity, a common theme in his films.

Cast
 Fern Andra as Königin Isabeau
 Fritz Kortner as Connetable
 Hans Heinrich von Twardowski as Page
 Elsa Wagner
 Lothar Müthel as Jehan
 John Gottowt as Buckliger Narr
 Albert Lind
 Alexander Moissi as King Karl VI.
 Harald Paulsen

References

Bibliography
 Jacobsen, Wolfgang. Babelsberg: das Filmstudio. Argon, 1994.
 Jung, Uli & Schatzberg, Walter. Beyond Caligari: The Films of Robert Wiene. Berghahn Books, 1999.

External links

1920s historical drama films
Films of the Weimar Republic
1920 films
German silent feature films
Lost drama films
German historical drama films
Films directed by Robert Wiene
Films set in France
Films set in Paris
Films set in the 1400s
Films set in the 15th century
Lost German films
German black-and-white films
Films produced by Erich Pommer
1920 lost films
1920 drama films
Silent historical drama films
1920s German films
Films shot at Babelsberg Studios
1920s German-language films